Paul-Dylan Ivalu is a Canadian Inuk actor from Igloolik, Nunavut. He is best known for his role as Maniq in the film Before Tomorrow (Le Jour avant le lendemain), for which he received a Genie Award nomination for Best Actor at the 30th Genie Awards.

He costarred in the film with his real-life grandmother, Madeline Ivalu.

He previously also acted in film The Journals of Knud Rasmussen.

References

External links

Canadian male film actors
Inuit from Nunavut
Male actors from Nunavut
Inuit male actors
Living people
People from Igloolik
21st-century Canadian male actors
Year of birth missing (living people)